Atorian Perry (born October 26, 1999) is an American football wide receiver for the Wake Forest Demon Deacons.

High school career
Perry attended Park Vista Community High School in Lake Worth, Florida. He committed to play college football at Wake Forest University.

College career
After redshirting as a freshman at Wake Forest in 2018, Perry played in four games in 2019 and had four receptions for 62 yards and a touchdown. In 2020, he had 15 receptions for 211 yards and a touchdown over six games. Perry was named first team All-ACC in 2021 after recording 71 receptions for 1,293 yards and a school record 15 touchdowns.

References

External links

Wake Forest Demon Deacons bio

1999 births
Living people
Players of American football from Florida
American football wide receivers
Wake Forest Demon Deacons football players